Masako Furuichi (born 20 October 1996) is a Japanese freestyle wrestler. She won the gold medal in the women's 72 kg event at the 2021 World Wrestling Championships in Oslo, Norway. She is also a two-time medalist at the Asian Wrestling Championships.

Career 

She won the silver medal in the women's 75kg event at the 2017 Asian Wrestling Championships held in New Delhi, India. In 2018, she won the bronze medal in the women's 72kg event at the Asian Wrestling Championships held in Bishkek, Kyrgyzstan.

In 2019, she won one of the bronze medals in the women's 72 kg event at the World Wrestling Championships held in Nur-Sultan, Kazakhstan. She won the gold medal in the 72 kg event at the 2021 World Wrestling Championships in Oslo, Norway.

She won one of the bronze medals in the 72kg event at the 2022 World Wrestling Championships held in Belgrade, Serbia.

Achievements

References

External links 

 

Living people
1996 births
Place of birth missing (living people)
Japanese female sport wrestlers
World Wrestling Championships medalists
Asian Wrestling Championships medalists
21st-century Japanese women